Dr Pepper Snapple Group (also called Dr. Pepper/7up Inc.) was an American multinational soft drink company based in Plano, Texas, and as of July 2018 it is a business unit of the publicly traded conglomerate Keurig Dr Pepper.

Formerly Cadbury Schweppes Americas Beverages, part of Cadbury Schweppes, on May 5, 2008 it was spun off from Cadbury Schweppes as Dr Pepper Snapple Group, with trading in its shares starting on May 7, 2008 on the NYSE as "DPS". The remainder of Cadbury Schweppes become Cadbury, a confectionery group, on May 5, 2008.

On July 9, 2018, Keurig Green Mountain acquired Dr Pepper Snapple Group, and became Keurig Dr Pepper; the following day the merged company began trading anew on the NYSE as "KDP".

History
Beverage America and Select Beverages bottlers were purchased from the Carlyle Group in February 1998. Snapple, Mistic and Stewart's (formerly Cable Car Beverage) were sold by Triarc Companies, Inc. to Cadbury Schweppes in 2000 for $1.45 billion.  That October, Cadbury Schweppes purchased Royal Crown Cola from Triarc.

In 2006 and 2007, Cadbury Schweppes purchased the Dr Pepper/Seven Up Bottling Group, along with several other regional bottlers.  This allowed DPS to bottle many of its own beverages and combat the recent decision by many Pepsi and Coke bottlers who had dropped their Dr Pepper and Snapple products to promote new product additions from Pepsi and Coke.  Some of the Dr Pepper/Seven Up brands are still licensed to Pepsi, Coke and independent bottlers in various regions of the United States and Canada.

In November 2007, Cadbury Schweppes announced it would take the beverages unit public. In May 2008, Cadbury Schweppes demerged its beverage holdings forming the Dr Pepper Snapple Group.

Dr Pepper Snapple Group holds naming rights to the Dallas Stars' practice facility, the Dr Pepper Arena, which is located in Frisco, Texas. It also retains non-alcoholic beverage rights to each facility's concessions as a result of the deals as well as sponsorships with the NHL franchise.

In 2008, Dr Pepper Snapple Group purchased minority interest in Big Red, Inc, makers of Big Red, NuGrape, Nesbitt's and other flavored drinks.

In 2014, the company announced that it accomplished its goal of reducing use of polyethylene terephthalate (PET) in its plastic bottles. Dr Pepper Snapple lowered the amount of PET in its bottles by over 60 million pounds between 2007 and 2014.

On November 22, 2016, Dr Pepper Snapple announced plans to make a cash purchase of Bai Brands for $1.7 billion. It had previously purchased a minority stake in the company for $15 million in 2015.

On January 29, 2018, Keurig Green Mountain announced it was acquiring the Dr Pepper Snapple Group in an $18.7 billion deal.  The combined company would be named Keurig Dr Pepper and would trade publicly on the New York Stock Exchange. Shareholders of Dr Pepper Snapple Group would own 13% of the combined company, while Keurig shareholder and Cadbury current owner Mondelez International owning 13 to 14%, and JAB Holdings owning the remaining majority stake. The buyout and merger was closed on July 9, 2018. Larry Young, President and CEO of the Dr Pepper Snapple Group, retired those positions and joined the board of directors of Keurig Dr Pepper.

Products

 7 Up (United States only; 7 Up rights are held by PepsiCo or its licensees in all other markets) 
 A&W Root Beer
 Aguafiel
 Bai Brands
 Big Red
 Cactus Cooler
 Canada Dry (North America) (UK Schweppes/The Coca-Cola Company)
 Canfield's (Chicago Area)
 Clamato
 Crush
 Dejà Blue
 Diet Rite
 Dr Pepper (rights held by The Coca-Cola Company in most of Europe, by PepsiCo in Poland, Australia, New Zealand and Canada), and by Spendrups in Sweden.
 Hawaiian Punch 
 Hires
 IBC Root Beer
 Margaritaville
 Mistic
 Mott's
 Mr & Mrs T
 Nantucket Nectars
 Nehi
 Orangina (North America; brand owned by Suntory in the rest of the world)
 Peñafiel
 RC Cola
 ReaLemon
 ReaLime
 Rose's
 Schweppes
 Snapple
 Squirt
 Stewart's Fountain Classics
 Sun Drop
 Sunkist (manufactured under license)
 Tahitian Treat (Southeast US beverage)
 Venom Energy
 Vernors
 Wink
 Yoo-hoo

References

External links 

 Dr Pepper Snapple Group

Keurig Dr Pepper
Companies formerly listed on the New York Stock Exchange
Food and drink companies established in 2008
American companies established in 2008
Drink companies of the United States
Companies based in Plano, Texas
Corporate spin-offs
Food and drink companies based in Texas
2018 mergers and acquisitions